Dominican Monastery may refer to:

 Dominican Monastery (České Budějovice)
 Dominican Monastery (Frankfurt am Main)